Dino Bovoli (April 4, 1914 – March 13, 1988) was an Italian professional football player and coach.

External links

1914 births
People from Molinella
Italian footballers
Serie A players
Rimini F.C. 1912 players
F.C. Pro Vercelli 1892 players
Atalanta B.C. players
Inter Milan players
U.C. Sampdoria players
Italian football managers
U.S. Lecce managers
A.S. Acireale managers
Molinella Calcio 1911 players
A.S. Siracusa managers
Association football defenders
1988 deaths
Footballers from Emilia-Romagna
Sportspeople from the Metropolitan City of Bologna